Jesús María Zamora Ansorena (born 1 January 1955) is a Spanish former professional footballer who played as a midfielder.

Club career
Born in Rentería, Gipuzkoa, Zamora played his entire professional career with local club Real Sociedad. After a slow 1974–75 (nine games) he went on to make a further 446 La Liga appearances in the next 14 years, being an instrumental figure alongside the likes of namesake Jesús María Satrústegui.

Zamora's finest hour as a player undoubtedly came in the last game (and literally the last second) of the 1980–81 season, as he scored the tying goal at Sporting de Gijón, giving the Basques the needed point to clinch the league title at the expense of Real Madrid, whose players were already celebrating after a 3–1 away win against Real Valladolid, only to be told about Zamora's feat over a radio broadcast. He scored three in 31 matches the following campaign, as Sociedad renewed their domestic supremacy.

After retiring in 1989, Zamora worked with his only club in several capacities. From 2002 to 2004 he assisted Raynald Denoueix, and aided to a runner-up position in his second year. However, after another legendary teammate, José Mari Bakero, was relieved of his general manager duties by him, in late 2006, the season ended in relegation, the first in 40 years, and Zamora too resigned.

International career
Zamora played 30 times for Spain and scored three goals, his debut coming in a friendly with Italy on 21 December 1978. He took part in the UEFA Euro 1980 and 1982 FIFA World Cup finals, retiring after the 0–0 draw against England on 5 July 1982, in the latter competition – this would also be longtime clubmate Satrústegui's last match.

See also
List of La Liga players (400+ appearances)
List of one-club men in association football
List of Real Sociedad players

References

External links

1955 births
Living people
People from Errenteria
Sportspeople from Gipuzkoa
Spanish footballers
Footballers from the Basque Country (autonomous community)
Association football midfielders
La Liga players
Real Sociedad B footballers
Real Sociedad footballers
Spain international footballers
UEFA Euro 1980 players
1982 FIFA World Cup players
Basque Country international footballers
Real Sociedad non-playing staff